Jaldhaka (Joldhaaka, means covered under water) is an upazila of Nilphamari District in the Division of Rangpur, Bangladesh.

Geography
It has 45456 households and total area 303.52 km2. Its eastern part is surrounded by Golna Union, northern part by Dimla, western part by Nilphamary Sadar and southern part by Rangpur District.

Demographics
Par the 2001 Bangladesh census, Jaldhaka had a population of 274736, including 141715 males, 133021 females; Muslim 217944, Hindu 56480, Buddhist 38, Christian 113 and others 361.

As of the 1991 Bangladesh census, the upazila has a population of 233885. Males constitute 51.5% of the population, and females 48.5%. This Upazila's eighteen up population is 114763. Jaldhaka has an average literacy rate of 18.4% (7+ years), and the national average of 32.4% literate.

Administration
Jaldhaka Thana was formed in 1911 and it was turned into an upazila in 1983.

The upazila is divided into Jaldhaka Municipality and 11 union parishads namely: Balagram, Dharmapal, Douabari,  Golna,Golmunda, Kaimari, Kathali, Khutamara, Mirganj, Shaulmari, and Simulbari. The union parishads are subdivided into 69 mauzas and 61 villages.

Jaldhaka Municipality is subdivided into 9 wards and 15 mahallas.

See also
Upazilas of Bangladesh
Districts of Bangladesh
Divisions of Bangladesh

References

Upazilas of Nilphamari District